Wynne Crompton  (11 February 1907 – May 1988) was a Welsh international footballer. He was part of the Wales national football team between 1930 and 1931, playing 3 matches. He played his first match on 25  October 1930 against Scotland and his last match on 22 April 1931 against Ireland.

At club level, he played for Wrexham in the early 30s.

See also
 List of Wales international footballers (alphabetical)

References

1907 births
Welsh footballers
Wales international footballers
Wrexham A.F.C. players
Sportspeople from Wrexham County Borough
Association football defenders
1988 deaths